The 2013–14 Marquette Golden Eagles men's basketball team represented Marquette University in the 2013–14 NCAA Division I men's basketball season. Their coach Buzz Williams served in his sixth year as head coach. Marquette played its home games at the BMO Harris Bradley Center in Milwaukee, Wisconsin. Marquette was a member of the newly reorganized Big East Conference after the split of the old Big East because they are part of the Catholic 7. They finished the season 17–15, 9–9 in Big East play to finish in sixth place. They lost in the quarterfinals of the Big East tournament to Xavier. They did not participate in a postseason tournament.

At the end of the season, head coach Buzz Williams resigned to take the head coaching job at Virginia Tech. He was replaced by Duke assistant coach Steve Wojciechowski.

Preseason

Recruits

Departures

Roster

Schedule

|-
!colspan=9 style="background:#00386D; color:#FDBB30;"| Regular season

|-
!colspan=9 style=|Big East regular season

|-
!colspan=9 style="background:#00386D; color:#FDBB30;"| Big East tournament

Rankings

References

Marquette Golden Eagles men's basketball seasons
Marquette
Marquette Golden Eagles men's basketball
Marquette Golden Eagles men's basketball